Mónica Liyau (born 18 August 1967) is a Peruvian table tennis player. She competed in the women's singles event at the 1988 Summer Olympics.

References

1967 births
Living people
Peruvian female table tennis players
Olympic table tennis players of Peru
Table tennis players at the 1988 Summer Olympics
Sportspeople from Lima
Table tennis players at the 1987 Pan American Games
Medalists at the 1987 Pan American Games
Pan American Games medalists in table tennis
Pan American Games bronze medalists for Peru
20th-century Peruvian women
21st-century Peruvian women